A colon (from Greek: , pl. , cola) is a rhetorical figure consisting of a clause which is grammatically, but not logically, complete. In Latin, it is called a membrum or membrum orationis.

Sentences consisting of two cola are called dicola; those with three are tricola. The corresponding adjectives are dicolic and tricolic; colic is not used in this sense. In writing, these cola are often separated by colons.

An isocolon is a sentence composed of cola of equal syllabic length.

The Septuagint used this system in the poetic books such as the Psalms. 
When Jerome translated the books of the Prophets, he arranged the text colometrically.

The colometric system was used in bilingual codices of New Testament, such as Codex Bezae and Codex Claromontanus. Some Greek and Latin manuscripts also used this system, including Codex Coislinianus and Codex Amiatinus.

See also  
 Comma (rhetoric)

References

Bibliography  
 B.M. Metzger, The Text of the New Testament, its Transmission, Corruption and Restoration, Oxford University Press, 1992, pp. 29–30.

External links 
 Colon: Part of a glossary of classical rhetorical terms.
 'The Colon as Linguistic Sentence', section of a dissertation on rhetoric discussing the nature of the colon.

Rhetoric